Connor Peters (born 12 January 1996) is a professional footballer who plays for Wingate & Finchley. Born in England, he represents the Antigua and Barbuda national team.

Club career
In November 2015 he joined Stansted before moving onto Haringey Borough in January 2016.

International career
Peters was one of eight overseas based players who committed to represent the country in the summer of 2014. He made his international debut for Antigua and Barbuda on 3 September 2014 in a 2014 Caribbean Cup qualification game versus Anguilla. He chose to represent the country to honour his father who died nine years earlier.

References

External links
 

1996 births
Living people
Antigua and Barbuda footballers
English footballers
Footballers from the London Borough of Hackney
Association football defenders
Antigua and Barbuda international footballers
2014 Caribbean Cup players
Swansea City A.F.C. players
Dagenham & Redbridge F.C. players
Bishop's Stortford F.C. players
Heybridge Swifts F.C. players
Stansted F.C. players
Haringey Borough F.C. players
Wingate & Finchley F.C. players
Expatriate footballers in Poland